Alma is a former village in Upper Galilee, 10 km north of Safed. In medieval times, Alma was a Jewish settlement. It evolved into a mixed village in the early modern era, with a Muslim majority and a Jewish minority. After it had been destroyed in the earthquake of January 1837, it was rebuilt and inhabited by Muslims of Algerian origin. Under British rule, Alma was a part of the Safad Subdistrict. It was depopulated during the 1948 Arab-Israeli War on October 30, 1948, during Operation Hiram.

In 1949, a modern Israeli moshav named Alma was established east of the former village.

History
Alma was located in Galilee about 4 km south of the Lebanese border, near the present-day Moshav of Alma and the Circassian town of Rehaniya. There are several khirbas nearby. Ceramics from the Byzantine era have been found here. 

Remains of a ruined watch-tower was found on the crest of the ridge, and a quarter of a mile south of those there were three perfect dolmens, not very large.

Middle ages 
While travelling though the region in the 12th century CE, Benjamin of Tudela noted that Alma contained fifty Jewish inhabitants and a "large cemetery of the Israelites." Fragments of Hebrew and Aramaic inscriptions from an ancient synagogue were found at the site of the village.

The Crusaders called the village "Alme".

Ottoman era
At the beginning of the period of Ottoman rule over Palestine, an Italian traveller to Alma in 1523 noted that there were 15 Jewish families there and one synagogue.

In the Ottoman tax registers of 1596, the village is listed as forming part of the nahiya ("subdistrict") of Jira in the liwa' ("district") of Safad. It had a relatively large population of 1,440, consisting of 288 Muslim households and 140 Muslim bachelors, together with seven Jewish households and one Jewish bachelor. The village paid taxes on goats, beehives, a water-powered mill, and a press that was used for processing olives or grapes. Total tax revenue amounted to a substantial 51,100 akce. Alma's prosperity was attributed to its close proximity to Safad.

The village was totally destroyed in the earthquake of January 1837. 
Edward Robinson and Eli Smith, who travelled to the region in 1838, give the full name of the village as 'Alma el-Khait.

James Finn, the British consul to Jerusalem who travelled around Palestine between 1853 and 1856, describes the village of Alma as being situated in an area in which volcanic basalt was abundant. Around the village, women and children were gathering olives from the trees by beating them with poles and then collecting the fallen fruit. He notes that the small district in which the village is located is known by the locals as "the Khait" (Arabic for "string") and that they "boast of its extraordinary fertility in corn-produce."

Victor Guérin visited in 1875, and noted that 200 Muslim inhabitants lived there. 
In The Survey of Western Palestine (1881), Alma is described as a village built of stone with about 250 "Algerine Mohammedan" residents, situated in the middle of a fertile plain with a few gardens.

A population list from about 1887 showed Alma to have about 1,105 Muslim inhabitants.

British Mandate period
The population of Alma in the 1922 census consisted of 309 Muslims, increasing to 712 Muslims in 148 occupied houses by 1931.

In the 1945 statistics, the population had reached 950, still all Muslim.

The villagers were heavily involved in agriculture, including raising livestock and growing crops. During the 1942/43 season olive trees were recorded as being grown on 750 dunums of village land, 550 dunums of which were fruit-bearing trees. It was the largest olive grove in Safad district. In 1944–45 983 dunums were irrigated or used for orchards and 7,475 dunums were devoted to cereal crops.

The village comprised a total area of 19,498 dunums of which 17,240 dunums was run by Arabs and the rest public. The population of the village was entirely Arab in ethnicity and Muslim in religion. They had their own mosque and elementary school, which pupils from al-Rihaniyya also attended.

A large number of inhabitants were employed in cereal farming, which occupied about 38% of the land area. Some land was also allocated for irrigation and plantation, and the growing of olives.

Types of landuse in dunams by Arabs in 1945:

The land ownership of the village before occupation in dunums:

1948 war and aftermath
The village was captured by the Israel Defense Forces in Operation Hiram on 30 October 1948. Israeli historian Benny Morris has documented that Alma was the one village in the area where the villagers were uprooted and/or expelled by the Israeli forces, in spite of the fact that they had not offered any resistance.
 
In 1949, the Israeli moshav of Alma was built about 0.5 km east of where the built-up portion of the former village was located. Today, local farmers cultivate fruit and olives on the village site, which is fenced in and covered with rubble and the remains of buildings.

References

Bibliography

 (p. 205)

External links
Welcome To 'Alma
 'Alma, Zochrot
Survey of Western Palestine, Map 4: IAA, Wikimedia commons
'Alma at Khalil Sakakini Cultural Center
'Alma, Dr. Khalil Rizk.

Arab villages depopulated during the 1948 Arab–Israeli War
District of Safad
Ancient Jewish settlements of Galilee
Cities destroyed by earthquakes